Róbert Litauszki (born 15 March 1990) is a Hungarian football player who plays for Vasas.

Club statistics

Updated to games played as of 14 March 2020.

Honours
Újpest
Magyar Kupa (1): 2013–14

References

External links
 Player profile at HLSZ 
 Player profile at MLSZ 
 

1990 births
Living people
Footballers from Budapest
Hungarian footballers
Hungary under-21 international footballers
Association football defenders
Újpest FC players
MKS Cracovia (football) players
Vasas SC players
Nemzeti Bajnokság II players
Nemzeti Bajnokság I players
Ekstraklasa players
Hungarian expatriate footballers
Expatriate footballers in Poland
Hungarian expatriate sportspeople in Poland